is a Hiroshima-style okonomiyaki food theme park located at 5-13 Shintenchi in Naka-ku, Hiroshima, Hiroshima Prefecture, Japan. It is near the east end of Hondōri and has over 25 okonomiyaki restaurants, each with a slightly different style and set of ingredients. The restaurants there use a specialty okonomiyaki sauce created especially for Okonomi-mura by Sun Foods.

The Nihon Keizai Shimbun reported that Okonomi-mura was the top food theme park destination for families in Japan according to an April 2004 poll.

History and location
Okonomi-mura is located at 5-13 Shintenchi in Naka-ku, Hiroshima, Hiroshima Prefecture, Japan, near the east end of Hondōri. The Shintenchi area became a place where many of these shops began going beyond the original ingredients and making it . This area is where the Okonomi-mura building was eventually built.

Access
Okonomi-mura is accessible from Hatchobori Station on the Hiroden Main and Hiroden Hakushima Lines. It is located about a 3-5 minutes walk south-southwest of the station, just off Chūō-dōri. From the Hiroden Main Line Hondōri Station, it is about a 6-8 minute walk southeast of the station.

Amenities
Okonomimura has over 25 okonomiyaki restaurants , each with a slightly different style and set of ingredients. The restaurants are spread across four floors of the building. It was the top food theme park destination for families in Japan according to an April 2004 poll. Sunfoods created a specialty okonomiyaki sauce used exclusively by the restaurants in Okonomi-mura.

References

External links
 Okonomi-mura (official site) 
 Okonomiyaki World (English informational site)

Japanese restaurants
Restaurant districts and streets in Japan
Restaurants in Japan
Tourist attractions in Hiroshima